Togetherness is an American comedy-drama television series created by Mark Duplass, Jay Duplass and Steve Zissis. It is primarily written and directed by the Duplass brothers, and stars Mark Duplass, Melanie Lynskey, Amanda Peet, Steve Zissis, and Abby Ryder Fortson. The series focuses on themes such as marriage and friendship.

The show's first season premiered on HBO on January 11, 2015. The series was renewed for an eight-episode second season, which premiered on February 21, 2016.

On March 25, 2016 Togetherness was canceled after two seasons.

Cast

Main
 Mark Duplass as Brett Pierson, a sound editor and Michelle's husband
 Melanie Lynskey as Michelle Pierson, Brett's wife
 Amanda Peet as Tina Morris, Michelle's sister
 Steve Zissis as Alex Pappas, an aspiring actor and Brett's best friend
 Abby Ryder Fortson as Sophie Pierson, Brett and Michelle's daughter (recurring season 1, starring season 2)

Recurring
 Peter Gallagher as Larry Kozinski, a producer and Tina's boyfriend
 John Ortiz as David Garcia, a single father who becomes involved with Michelle
 Joshua Leonard as Dudley Walker, a director
 Mary Steenburgen as Linda, a free spirited woman who becomes Brett's friend (season 1)
 Amy Adair as Peggy, the Pierson's babysitter (season 1)
 Ginger Gonzaga as Christy, a film industry worker and Alex's girlfriend (season 2)
 Katie Aselton as Anna, a helper in Michelle's school plan (season 2)
 Emily Althaus as Natalie, a woman Brett meets while working for Uber (season 2)

Episodes

Production
In January 2013, HBO ordered the pilot for the series with, Mark Duplass and Jay Duplass writing, directing, and executive producing the series, with Stephanie Langhoff under their Duplass Brothers Productions banner. In March 2013, it was revealed that Amanda Peet, Melanie Lynskey and Steve Zissis joined the cast of the series. In May 2013, it was revealed that Mark Duplass would be starring in the pilot in the lead role. In July 2013, the pilot was picked up to series, with Steve Zissis now joining as a consultant producer and writer. In January 2016, Katie Aselton joined the series in a recurring role. Michael Andrews composed the score for the series.

Reception

Critical response
The first season received positive reviews from many critics. Review aggregator Rotten Tomatoes gave the first season a 93% approval rating, with an average rating of 8.08 out of 10 based on 43 critic reviews. The critical consensus reads: "Togetherness is a delightful surprise that interweaves day-to-day life with moving, dramatic characters who have an affinity for deprecating, squirmy humor." Metacritic gave the first season a score of 79 based on 23 critic reviews, indicating "generally favorable reviews". IGN reviewer Matt Fowler gave the entire first season an 8.3 out of 10, saying that "The Duplass brothers, along with several wonderful performances, have managed to take an oft-trodden road and paved it fresh."

The second season continued to receive positive reviews from critics. Rotten Tomatoes gave the second season an 88% approval rating, with an average rating of 7.42 out of 10 based on 17 critic reviews. The critical consensus reads: "Togetherness returns with its charm intact, though its compelling characters could stand to have a few more laughs."  On Metacritic, it has a score of 73 out of 100 based on 12 reviews, indicating "generally favorable reviews". Alan Sepinwall of HitFix wrote, "The stories are told with such intimacy, such empathy, and such attention to detail, that it transcends labels and generalities" and that the show is "even better this year".

Accolades
For the 5th Critics' Choice Television Awards, Melanie Lynskey was nominated for Best Supporting Actress in a Comedy Series and Peter Gallagher was nominated for Best Guest Performer in a Comedy Series.

International broadcast
In Canada, the series aired on HBO Canada simultaneously with the American broadcast, and premiered on January 11, 2015. In Australia, the series premiered on April 21, 2015, on Showcase.

References

External links 
 
 

2010s American comedy-drama television series
2015 American television series debuts
2016 American television series endings
English-language television shows
HBO original programming
Television series by Duplass Brothers Productions
Television series by Warner Bros. Television Studios
Television shows set in Los Angeles